The Ministry of Science and Technology is a government ministry in Israel, headed by the Science and Technology Minister. The portfolio has been renamed several times since its creation, and has previously included Culture and Sport, which is now the responsibility of the Culture and Sport Ministry. In April 2013, the Ministry added "Space" to its name to promote space research and technology.

The ministry is responsible for defining national policy on issues related to Science and technology in Israel, and promoting scientific and technological research, infrastructure and projects. In addition, under its jurisdiction, it acts to develop human capital, increase the social and economic vigor of Israeli society, and maintain equal opportunity in all areas of science and technology. Amongst its goals, the Ministry constitutes a connecting link between basic research, applied research and industrial development. Another central goal of the Ministry is to strengthen as well as initiate international scientific collaborations with other countries and international organization.

List of ministers

Deputy ministers

See also
Science and technology in Israel

References

External links
Official website
All Ministers in the Ministry of Science Knesset website

Science
Ministry of Science
Science
Science and technology in Israel
Scientific organizations based in Israel
Space program of Israel
Israel
Israel